Dodia sazonovi is a moth of the family Erebidae. It was described by Vladimir Viktorovitch Dubatolov in 1990. It is found in Russia (Aktash).

References

Callimorphina
Moths described in 1990